Estudiantes Tecos Reserves is the newest brand of soccer for Estudiantes Tecos. They play in the newly formed Campeonato Sub-20 y Sub-17 de México.
On April 14, 2012 Estudiantes Tecos was relegated to Ascenso MX. On May 22, 2014, Grupo Pachuca president, Jesús Martínez Patiño, announced Estudiantes Tecos would change its location and move to Zacatecas. On May 28, 2014 the move was confirmed, the club changed its name to Mineros de Zacatecas, and Estudiantes Tecos were dissolved, but still has a team in Second Division. However, after the 2014–15 season all Estudiantes Tecos reserves for Mineros de Zacatecas was moved to Zacatecas and also dissolved entirely for good.

Current U-20 roster
Current squad as December

Current U-17 roster
Current squad as August 2013

 

asterisk denotes player has also been called up to U-20 team.

Stadium

Estadio Tres de Marzo

Estudiantes Tecos U-20 plays home football matches at Estadio 3 de Marzo which is located in Zapopan, Jalisco. It has a capacity of 30,015 and was constructed inside the campus of the Universidad Autónoma de Guadalajara. In 1999, Estadio Tres de Marzo underwent its last major renovation which included improvements such as a new pitch and drainage system. The stadium takes its name from the founding date of the Universidad Autónoma de Guadalajara, on March 3, 1935.

Cancha 2 "Jorge Campos"
Estudiantes Tecos U-17 plays home football matches at Cancha 2 "Jorge Campos".

Notable players
 Mauricio Vallejo
 Juan Carlos Leaño
 Arnhold Rivas

References

External links
 Official Website

Mexican reserve football clubs
Association football clubs established in 2009
Tecos F.C.
2009 establishments in Mexico